Leonardo Balerdi Rosa (born 1999) is an Argentine professional footballer who plays for Ligue 1 club Marseille and the Argentina national team.

Club career

Boca Juniors 
Balerdi made his debut for Boca Juniors in the Argentine Primera División starting against Club Atlético Huracán on 27 August 2018. Although only appearing 5 times for Boca Juniors (a total of 450 minutes on the pitch), Balerdi's performances took Argentinian football by storm and he has rapidly been hailed as Argentina's best upcoming defender.

Borussia Dortmund 
In January 2019, Balerdi agreed to a four and a half year contract with Borussia Dortmund. According to several Argentine reports, Dortmund has agreed to pay €15 million for the central defender. An additional €2 million might need to be paid due to agreed add-ons.

Balerdi made his Dortmund and Bundesliga debut on 7 December 2019 against Fortuna Düsseldorf coming onto the pitch as a substitute in the 78th minute. After a few substitute appearances, Balerdi made his first start against 1899 Hoffenheim in the last Bundesliga fixture of the 2019–20 season. He was substituted in the 65th minute as Dortmund trailed 0–4.

Olympique de Marseille (loan) 
In July 2020, Balerdi signed with Olympique de Marseille on a one-year loan deal with a option to buy for €15 million.

Olympique de Marseille
On 3 July 2021, Balerdi joined Marseille on a permanent basis, signing a five-year contract with the club.

International career
Balerdi made his Argentina national team debut on 10 September 2019 in a friendly against Mexico. He replaced Lucas Martínez Quarta in the 83rd minute.

Career statistics

Club

Honours 

Marseille
 Trophée des Champions runner-up: 2020

References

External links
 
 

1999 births
Living people
People from Villa Mercedes, San Luis
Argentine footballers
Association football defenders
Argentina international footballers
Argentina youth international footballers
Argentina under-20 international footballers
Boca Juniors footballers
Argentine Primera División players
Regionalliga players
Borussia Dortmund players
Borussia Dortmund II players
Olympique de Marseille players
Argentine expatriate footballers
Expatriate footballers in Germany
Expatriate footballers in France
Argentine expatriate sportspeople in Germany
Argentine expatriate sportspeople in France
Bundesliga players
Ligue 1 players